Thoma Çami was a Cham Albanian leader and one of the main contributors to the revival of Albanian culture during the National Renaissance of Albania. He was a founder and the first chairman of the organization "Bashkimi", the best-known cultural club of the Albanian National Awakening. He also wrote the first scholarly history book for Albanian schools, but died before the Albanian declaration of independence.

References
Anamali, Skënder and Prifti, Kristaq. Historia e popullit shqiptar në katër vëllime. Botimet Toena, 2002, .

Year of birth missing
Year of death missing
Albanian children's writers
Cham Albanians